Lovers of Paris (original title Pot-Bouille, "Stew Pot") is a 1957 French film directed by Julien Duvivier and starring Gérard Philipe. It is based on the 1882 novel Pot-Bouille by Émile Zola.

The movie is in black and white, and filmed in 35 mm. It was shot at the Billancourt Studios in Paris and on location in the city. The sets were designed by the art director Léon Barsacq. It premiered in France on October 18, 1957.

It was the second film Duvivier directed based on a novel in Zola's Rougon-Macquart series, the first being Au Bonheur des Dames in 1930.

Plot
A young provincial, Octave Mouret, arrives in Paris during the Second Empire. Madame Josserand, a society woman who thinks of little other than marrying off her daughter Berthe, sets her sights on him. But Octave has already turned his attention to the married Madame Hédouin, who runs a large department store, "Au Bonheur des Dames", where he is hired as a salesman. She is beautiful, but remains distant despite Octave's efforts to be noticed. Upset, Madame Josserand forces Berthe, against her will, to marry Auguste Vabre, a shopkeeper with little money. Berthe soon becomes Octave's mistress, and Octave applies his commercial talents to straightening out Auguste's finances. Madame Hédouin, now widowed, then realizes the business and romantic possibilities with her handsome young salesman.

Cast 

 Gérard Philipe as Octave Mouret
 Danielle Darrieux as Caroline Hédouin
 Dany Carrel as Berthe Josserand
 Jacques Duby as Auguste Vabre
 Jane Marken as Eléonore Josserand
 Olivier Hussenot as Joseph Josserand
 Anouk Aimée as Marie Pichon
 Danielle Dumont as Hortense Josserand
 Henri Vilbert as Narcisse Bachelard
 Claude Nollier as Clotilde Duveyrier
 Micheline Luccioni as Valérie Vabre
 Judith Magre as Rachel
 Michèle Grellier as Fanny
 Germaine de France as Mlle Menu
 Gabrielle Fontan as Mme Pilou
 Alexandre Rignault as Gourd
 Van Doude as Hector Trublot
 Catherine Samie as  Clémence
 Jean-Louis Le Goff as The sommelier
 Henri Coutet as A laborer in the yard
 Albert Médina as The conductor
 Pascale de Boysson as Gasparine
 Jean Brochard as Monsieur Duveyrier
 Arielle Coignet as Louise
 Georges Cusin as Achille Compardon
 Liliane Ernout as The client at "Rendu"
 Jacques Eyser as A doctor
 Jacques Grello as Théophile Vabre
 Gaston Jacquet as Hippolyte Vabre
 Jenny Orléans as Rose Compardon
 Rivers Cadet as The notary
 Monique Vita as Clarisse Boquet
 Denise Gence as Lisa
 Valérie Vivin as Adèle
 Paul Faivre as Stagecoach driver
 Charles Lemontier as Man passing in the street
 Jean Degrave as A guest
 René Worms as A guest
 Andrès as A guest
 Marius Gaidon as A server
 Roger Lecuyer as A wedding guest
 Lydia Ewande as Clarisse's maid
 Paule Launay
 Betty Beckers as Valérie's maid

Crew
 Director: Julien Duvivier
 Screenplay: Julien Duvivier, Léo Joannon, Henri Jeanson
 Assistant directors: Michel Romanoff, Pierre Maho
 Cinematography: Michel Kelber, assisted by André Domage
 Sound: Jacques Carrère, assisted by Guy Chichignoud
 Set design: Léon Barsacq
 Editing: Madeleine Gug
 Music: Jean Wiener, orchestra under the direction of André Girard, featuring Ray Ventura
 Costumes: Marcel Escoffier, Jean Zay, Emmanuel Bourrassin
 Makeup: Jean-Ulysse Piedeloup and Igor Keldich
 Hairstyling: Jean Lalaurette
 Theatrical director: Tonio Sune
 Production: Paris Films Production (Paris), Panitalia (Rome)
 Heads of production: Robert and Raymond Hakim
 Director of production: Ludmilia Goulian
 Production assistant: Pierre Duvivier
 Distributor: C.C.F.C
 Set designer: Maurice Barnathan

References

External links 
 

1957 films
1950s historical drama films
French historical drama films
Films based on works by Émile Zola
Films directed by Julien Duvivier
French black-and-white films
Films set in the 19th century
Films set in Paris
Films shot in Paris
Films shot at Billancourt Studios
1957 drama films
1950s French-language films
1950s French films